Green Township is one of fifteen townships in Wayne County, Indiana, United States. As of the 2010 census, its population was 1,222 and it contained 455 housing units.

History
Green Township was organized in 1821. Green Township was named for one John Green, a Native American.

Geography
The streams of Collor Creek, Fruit Branch, Hopewell Run, Morgan Creek, Town Creek, Well Brook, William Creek and Williamsburg Creek run through this township.

Unincorporated towns
 Williamsburg at 
(This list is based on USGS data and may include former settlements.)

Adjacent townships
 Washington Township, Randolph County (north)
 New Garden Township (east)
 Webster Township (southeast)
 Center Township (south)
 Clay Township (southwest)
 Perry Township (west)
 Union Township, Randolph County (northwest)

Cemeteries
The township contains three cemeteries: Old Center, Old Concord and Williamsburg.

Major highways
 U.S. Route 35

References
 
 United States Census Bureau cartographic boundary files

External links
 Indiana Township Association
 United Township Association of Indiana

Townships in Wayne County, Indiana
Townships in Indiana